Stacey Hairston (born August 16, 1967) is an American gridiron football coach and former player.  He is the defensive coordinator at Urbana University in Urbana, Ohio.  Hairston was head football coach at Wilmington College in Wilmington, Ohio from 2013 until 2016.  He served as the interim head coach at Ohio Northern University for one season, in 2003.

College career
Hairston played college football at Ohio Northern University.

Professional career

Dallas Cowboys
Hairston was with the Dallas Cowboys for the 1989 season.

Saskatchewan Roughriders
From 1990 to 1992 Hairston played with the Saskatchewan Roughriders of the Canadian Football League (CFL).

Seattle Seahawks
Hairston spent a brief period of time with the Seattle Seahawks in 1993, but was waived.

Cleveland Browns
Hairston played for the Cleveland Browns for the 1993 season and 1994 season (Hairston was on the injured reserve for the 1995 season).

Coaching career
For the vast majority of his career Hairston was a coach at Ohio Northern University culminating as being named interim head coach in 2003.  Hairston has also been on the coaching staff of the Edmonton Eskimos of the Canadian Football league and of Bluefield College.  
Hairston was also the women's golf coach at Ohio Northern and is a six handicap as a player.

Wilmington
Hairston became the coach at Wilmington College in Wilmington, Ohio for the 2013 season, which plays in the Ohio Athletic Conference (the same conference as Ohio Northern). In his first two seasons, the Quakers compiled a record of 0–20. Hairston's first victory as head coach of Wilmington came in first game of the 2015 season, a 14–10 win over non-conference opponent Bluffton. His teams lost every game remaining that year and were winless the following season, in 2016. Hairston resigned from his post at Wilmington on November 18, 2016, having collected record of 1–39 over four seasons with no wins in conference play.

Head coaching record

References

External links
 Urbana profile
 Wilmington profile
 

1967 births
Living people
American football defensive backs
Bluefield Rams football coaches
Cleveland Browns players
Edmonton Elks coaches
Ohio Northern Polar Bears football coaches
Ohio Northern Polar Bears football players
Saskatchewan Roughriders players
Urbana Blue Knights football coaches
Wilmington Quakers football coaches
College golf coaches in the United States
Players of Canadian football from Columbus, Ohio
Players of American football from Columbus, Ohio
African-American coaches of American football
African-American players of American football
21st-century African-American people
20th-century African-American sportspeople
Sportspeople from Columbus, Ohio